Csonkahegyhát is a village in Zala County, Hungary.
The population of Country is estimated on 01-01-2019 is 315.

References

Populated places in Zala County

http://www.csonkahegyhat.hu/